The Hungarian Ladies Open was a women's tennis tournament held in Budapest, Hungary. This WTA Tour event was an International-level tournament and was played on indoor hardcourts.

Past finals

Singles

Doubles

See also
List of tennis tournaments
Budapest Grand Prix
Hungarian Pro Circuit Ladies Open
Stella Artois Clay Court Championships
Budapest Challenger (September)
Budapest Challenger (May)

References

External links
Official Home Page
WTA Tour profile

 
 
Grand Prix
Tennis tournaments in Hungary
Clay court tennis tournaments
WTA Tour
Recurring sporting events established in 1993
ITF Women's World Tennis Tour
1993 establishments in Hungary